Asifabad Assembly constituency is a SC reserved constituency of Telangana Legislative Assembly, India. It is one of two constituencies in Komaram Bheem district. It comes under Adilabad Lok Sabha constituency along with 6 other Assembly constituencies.

Kova Laxmi of Telangana Rashtra Samithi represented the constituency till 2018. Athram Sakku of Indian National Congress is representing the constituency since 2018.

Mandals
The Assembly Constituency presently comprises the following Mandals:

Members of Legislative Assembly

Andhra Pradesh

Telangana State

Election results

Telangana Legislative Assembly election, 2018

Telangana Legislative Assembly election, 2014

See also
 List of constituencies of Telangana Legislative Assembly

References

Assembly constituencies of Telangana
Komaram Bheem district